Maxwellton is a hamlet in Excel Rural Municipality No. 71, Saskatchewan, Canada.

See also

List of communities in Saskatchewan
Hamlets of Saskatchewan

References

Excel No. 71, Saskatchewan
Unincorporated communities in Saskatchewan
Division No. 3, Saskatchewan